The Women's time trial of the 2011 Dutch National Time Trial Championships cycling event took place on 22 June 2011 in and around Veendam, Netherlands.

Marianne Vos became for the second time in her career Dutch National Time Trial Champion. She finished 6 seconds ahead of Ellen van Dijk and 64 seconds of Loes Gunnewijk.

Final classification

Results from uci.ch.

References

External links

Dutch National Time Trial Championships
2011 in women's road cycling
Sports competitions in Groningen (province)
Sport in Veendam